Shrewsbury Peak is a mountain located in Rutland County, Vermont, in the Calvin Coolidge State Forest. 
The mountain is part of the Coolidge Range.
Shrewsbury is flanked to the northwest by Little Killington.

The northeast slopes of Shrewsbury Peak drain into Madden Brook, thence into the Ottauquechee River, the Connecticut River, and into Long Island Sound in Connecticut.
The southeast slopes of Shrewsbury Peak drain into Woodward Reservoir, thence into the Ottauquechee River.
The south end of Shrewsbury Peak drains into Tinker Brook, thence into the headwaters of the Black River, another tributary of Connecticut River.
The southwest slopes of Shrewsbury Peak drain into Gould Brook, thence into the Cold River, and Otter Creek, which drains into Lake Champlain, and thence into the Richelieu River in Québec, the Saint Lawrence River, and into the Gulf of Saint Lawrence.
The west side of Shrewsbury Peak drains into Sargent Brook, thence into Gould Brook and the Cold River.

Notes

See also 
 List of mountains in Vermont

External links 
  Peakbagger.com: Shrewsbury Peak
 

Mountains of Vermont
Mountains of Rutland County, Vermont